Lori Michelle Chavez-DeRemer (born April 7, 1968) is an American politician from Oregon. As a member of the Republican Party, she represents  in the United States House of Representatives. She is the first Republican woman to represent Oregon in the House.

Education 
Chavez-DeRemer is a graduate of Hanford High School in Kings County, California. She earned a BBA degree in business administration and management from California State University, Fresno.

Early political career 
Chavez-DeRemer was elected to the city council of Happy Valley, Oregon, in 2004. She was elected mayor in 2010 and reelected in 2014. She served as mayor until 2018.

In 2016, after incumbent Shemia Fagan opted not to seek reelection to her seat in Oregon House District 51, Chavez-DeRemer filed to run as a Republican, and won the primary unopposed. She lost by 564 votes to restaurateur Janelle Bynum in the November general election, in what was the most expensive state House race in Oregon of 2016.

In June 2017, Chavez-DeRemer formed a political action committee to explore a gubernatorial bid in 2018. In October 2017, she announced in a YouTube video that she would not run for governor, clearing the primary for eventual nominee Knute Buehler. 

In January 2018, Chavez-DeRemer, in her capacity as mayor of Happy Valley, met with President Donald Trump in Washington, D.C.

In March 2018, Chavez-DeRemer announced her intention to again run for House District 51. She was unopposed in the Republican primary. She again lost to Bynum, by 2,223 votes.

U.S. House of Representatives

Elections

2022 

Chavez-DeRemer won the May 2022 Republican primary for Oregon's 5th congressional district. The district, which had been represented for seven terms by moderate Democrat Kurt Schrader, was significantly altered in redistricting after Oregon gained a House seat. It lost its share of the Pacific coastline and the state capital of Salem, but stretched further south to gain rapidly-growing Bend. Schrader lost the Democratic primary to Jamie McLeod-Skinner. 

Chavez-DeRemer defeated McLeod-Skinner in the November 8 general election.

Both Chavez-DeRemer and McLeod-Skinner lived just outside the district at the time of the election. Under the U.S. Constitution, members of the U.S. House must be residents of their state, but do not have to live in the district.

Committee assignments
Committee on Agriculture
Subcommittee on Commodity Markets, Digital Assets, and Rural Development
Subcommittee on Forestry
Committee on Education and the Workforce
Subcommittee on Higher Education and Workforce Investment
Subcommittee on Health, Employment, Labor, and Pensions
Committee on Transportation and Infrastructure
Subcommittee on Aviation
Subcommittee on Economic Development, Public Buildings and Emergency Management
Subcommittee on Highways and Transit

Personal life 
Chavez-DeRemer is married to Shawn DeRemer, an anesthesiologist. The couple lives in Happy Valley and has two children.

Chavez-DeRemer is Roman Catholic.

Electoral history

2022

2018

2016

2014

2010

See also

List of Hispanic and Latino Americans in the United States Congress

References

External links
 Congresswoman Lori Chavez-DeRemer official U.S. House website
 Lori Chavez-DeRemer for Congress

 

|-

1968 births
21st-century American women politicians
American politicians of Mexican descent
American Roman Catholics
California State University, Fresno alumni
Catholics from Oregon
Female members of the United States House of Representatives
Hispanic and Latino American city council members
Hispanic and Latino American mayors
Hispanic and Latino American members of the United States Congress
Hispanic and Latino American people in Oregon politics
Hispanic and Latino American women in politics
Living people
Oregon Republicans
People from Happy Valley, Oregon
Republican Party members of the United States House of Representatives from Oregon
Women city councillors in Oregon
Women mayors of places in Oregon